The 2022–23 season is Ittihad Riadi Tanger's 40th season in existence and the club's 24th in the top flight of Moroccan football, and eighth consecutive.

Kit
Supplier: Gloria
Club Sponsor: Tanger-Med (front)
League Sponsor: Inwi (sleeves)

Season review

July

On 12 July, Ittihad Tanger announced the dismissal of Juan Pedro Benali as the first team coach.

On 15 July, Ittihad Tanger announced the appointment of Ezzaki Badou as the new first team head coach until 2026.

On 20 July, Ittihad Tanger announced the signing of Jawad Ghabra from Nahdat Zemamra on a free transfer. On the same day, Ahmad Hamoudan signed with AS FAR after the expiration of his contract, ending ten years with the club.

On 31 July, Ittihad Tanger announced the signing of Zakaria Kiani from Youssoufia Berrechid on a free transfer. In the same day, the club announced the signing of Marwan Bakali from Widad Témara on a free transfer. Later that day, the club announced the signing of Joé Amian, and Mohammed Said Bouksyr both from Olympique Dcheira on a free transfer.

August

On 1 August, Ittihad Tanger announced the signing of goalkeeper Badreddine Benachour from Saudi club Al-Kawkab FC, the signing of Ismail El Alami from Chabab Fath Casablancais, Ayoub Rahmaoui, and Hassan Zraibi both from Kénitra AC on a free transfers.

On 2 August, Ittihad Tanger announced the signing of Abdelali El Asri from Chabab Alam Tanger and Mahmoud El Kayssoumi from Ajax Tanger, and announced the promotion of Yassine Dihaz, Saber Yazidi, Bilal El Hankouri, and Badreddin Bakkali from the Espoir team.

On 4 August, Ittihad Tanger announced the contract extension of Ayoub Jarfi until 2024.

On 5 August, Ittihad Tanger announced the signing of Aissa Sioudi on loan from Wydad AC.

On 16 August, Ittihad Tanger announced the signing of Donou Hubert from Al-Shabab SC, and Ngagne Fall from AS Génération Foot, both on free transfers.

On 21 August, Ittihad Tanger and Marwan Bakali have reached an agreement to terminate the player’s contract.

On 27 August, Ittihad Tanger and Raja CA reached an agreement for the transfer of Axel Méyé.

September

On 3 September, Ittihad Tanger announced the signing of Adnan Souiss from WA Fes on a free transfer.

On 5 September, Ittihad Tanger announced the signing of Mohamed Souboul on loan from Raja CA.

On 10 September, Ittihad Tanger announced the signing of Abdou Atchabao from MAS Fes on a free transfer.

October

On 18 October, Ittihad Tanger announces the termination of its contract with coach Badou Ezzaki.

January

On 15 January, Mohammed Cherkaoui was elected as the new club president.

On 21 January, Ittihad Tanger announced the appointment of Hilal Ettair as the new first team head coach. In the same day, IRT announced the signing of goalkeeper Zouhair Laaroubi on a free transfer.

On 22 January, Ittihad Tanger announced the signing of Mohsine Moutouali from Al Ahli Tripoli, and Amine Sadiki from Shabaab al Jabal, both on free transfers.

On 25 January, Ittihad Tanger announced the signing of the former midfielder Sofian El Moudane from RS Berkane and defender El Hadji Youssoupha Konaté on a free transfer.

On 27 January, Ittihad Tanger announced signing of the former midfielder Hatim Chentouf from Hassania Agadir on a free transfer.

On 31 January, Ittihad Tanger announced the signing of the two wingers Ali El Harrak, and Sabir Achefay from VV Noordwijk on a free transfer. The club also announced the signing of Mouhcine Rabja on loan from Difaâ Hassani El Jadidi.

February

On 1 February, Ittihad Tanger announced the signing of goalkeeper Gaya Merbah on loan from Raja CA.

On 2 February, Ittihad Tanger announced the signing of Zouhair El Ouassli from Olympic Azzaweya SC on a free transfer.

Squad

(A) = originally from the academy

From youth squad

On Loan

Transfers

In

Promoted

Loans in

Contract renewals

Out

Loans out

Technical staff 

until 18 October 2022.

until 25 October 2022.

until 20 January 2023.

until 25 January 2023.

Pre-season and friendlies

Competitions

Overview

Botola

Standings

Results summary

Results by round

Matches

Results overview

Throne Cup

Statistics

Squad appearances and goals
Last updated on 14 March 2023.

|-
! colspan=14 style=background:#dcdcdc; text-align:center|Goalkeepers

|-
! colspan=14 style=background:#dcdcdc; text-align:center|Defenders

|-
! colspan=14 style=background:#dcdcdc; text-align:center|Midfielders

|-
! colspan=14 style=background:#dcdcdc; text-align:center|Forwards

|-
! colspan=14 style=background:#dcdcdc; text-align:center| Players who have made an appearance or had a squad number this season but have left the club

|-
|}
 = ineligible players

Goalscorers

Assists

Hat-tricks

(H) – Home ; (A) – Away

Clean sheets
Last updated on 14 March 2023.

Disciplinary record

Injury record

See also

2015–16 IR Tanger season
2016–17 IR Tanger season 
2017–18 IR Tanger season
2018–19 IR Tanger season
2019–20 IR Tanger season
2020–21 IR Tanger season
2021–22 IR Tanger season

References

External links

Moroccan football club seasons
Ittihad Tanger
2022–23 in Moroccan football
Moroccan football clubs 2022–23 season